Dobrolyubov is a Russian masculine surname, its feminine counterpart is Dobrolyubova. It may refer to
 Aleksandr Dobrolyubov (writer) (1876–1945), Russian Symbolist poet
 Aleksandr Dobrolyubov (footballer) (born 1983), Russian footballer and football referee
Nikolay Dobrolyubov  (1836–1861), Russian literary critic, journalist, poet and revolutionary democrat

See also
Dobrolyubov Street (Yekaterinburg)

Russian-language surnames